Bidar Assembly seat is one of the seats in Karnataka Legislative Assembly in India. It is a segment of Bidar Lok Sabha seat.

Members of Assembly

Hyderabad State
 1951: Shafiuddin, Indian National Congress

Mysore State
 1957: Maqsood Ali Khan, Indian National Congress

 1962: Maqsood Ali Khan, Indian National Congress

 1967: C. Gurupadappa, Bharatiya Jan Sangh

 1972: Manikrao R. Phuleker, Indian National Congress

Karnataka State
 1978:	Veershetty Moglappa Kusnoor, Indian National Congress (Indira)

 1982: M. Kamal, Indian National Congress

 1983:	Narayana Rao Manahalli, Bharatiya Janata Party

 1985:	Mohd. Laiquddin Buranuddin, Indian National Congress

 1989:	Narayana Rao Manahalli, Bharatiya Janata Party

 1994:	Syed Zulfekar Hashmi (Baba Patel), Bahujan Samaj Party

 1999:	Rameshkumar Pande, Bharatiya Janata Party

 2004:	Bandeppa Kashempur, Independent

 2008:	Gurupadappa Nagamarapalli, Indian National Congress

 2009 (By-Poll): Rahim Khan, Indian National Congress

 2013:	Gurupadappa Nagamarapalli, Karnataka Janata Paksha

See also 
 List of constituencies of Karnataka Legislative Assembly

References 

Assembly constituencies of Karnataka
Bidar district